This is a list of Acacia species (sensu lato) that are used for the production of timber.

References

Acacia species, timber production
timber production